Diplomatic relations exist between Australia and Spain. In the 2016 Australian Census, 120,952 Australian residents claimed Spanish descent, while 15,391 indicated they were born in Spain. Both nations are members of the Organisation for Economic Co-operation and Development.

Historical relations

The earliest writings on the discovery of mainland Australia by European explorers date back to the early 17th century. However, Australian researcher Lawrence Hargrave argued that Spain had already established a colony in Botany Bay in the 16th century, a time when expeditions were organized to find Terra Australis. Later, French historian Roger Hervé claimed that the Spanish caravel San Lesmes was diverted to New Zealand and Tasmania, until it went up the Australian eastern coast and was captured by the Portuguese near what is now Cape York. In fact, a similar hypothesis was formulated by the Australian researcher Robert Adrian Langdon. In 1606, the Spanish sailor Luís Vaz de Torres, belonging to the expedition of the Portuguese explorer Queirós, was one of the first European explorers to encounter Australia and the first to map the Torres Strait, which is named in his honor. In 1793, the Malaspina Expedition sailed to Port Jackson (Sydney) on the coast of New South Wales, which had been established by the British in 1788.

Since the initial encounter, relations between Australia and Spain would not develop until the 20th century. From 1936 to 1939, Spain was embroiled in a civil war between the Republican faction and Nationalist faction. Australia was officially neutral during the conflict. However, over 66 Australians volunteered and fought for the Republican faction in Spain as part of the British Battalion.

Bilateral relations
On 26 October 1967, Australia and Spain officially established diplomatic relations. In May 1968, Spain opened an embassy in the Australian capital of Canberra. In June 1988, King Juan Carlos I of Spain paid an official visit to Australia. In July 2017, both nations celebrated 50 years since the establishment of diplomatic relations.

Throughout the years, both nations have signed numerous bilateral agreements such as an Extradition Treaty (1987); Agreement on Cultural, Education and Scientific cooperation (1991); Agreement on the Avoidance of Double-Taxation and the Prevention of Tax Evasion (1992); Agreement on Social Security (2002); Agreement on Air services (2009) and a Working holiday visa agreement (2014). In 2018, both countries celebrated the 50th anniversary of bilateral relations to expand and mutually reinforce them in all fields, coinciding with Australia Day. Both countries tend to develop increasingly cordial and strategic relations.

On 28 June 2022, Australian prime minister Anthony Albanese met with Spanish prime minister Pedro Sánchez in La Moncloa (in the first formal visit of an Australian prime minister to Spain), agreeing on the sending of a Spanish high-level trade delegation to Australia, and reaffirmed the commitment of both countries to a rapid conclusion of a "comprehensive and ambitious" Trade Agreement between Australia and the European Union.

High-level visits
High-level visits from Australia to Spain

 Governor General Quentin Bryce (2011)

High-level visits from Spain to Australia

 King Juan Carlos I of Spain (1988, 2009)
 Crown Prince Felipe VI of Spain (1990)
 Prime Minister Mariano Rajoy (2014)

Trade
In 2017, trade between Australia and Spain totaled US$3.4 billion. Australian merchandise exports to Spain were valued at $697 million, and included coal, other ores and concentrates, fruit and nuts, and electronic integrated circuits. Spanish merchandise exports to Australia were valued at $2 billion, with the biggest import items being passenger motor vehicles, medicaments (including veterinary), fixed vegetable oils and fats, and rubber tires, treads and tubes. In 2016, Australian investments in Spain totaled US$5.1 billion and at the same time, Spanish investments in Australia totaled US$948 million.

Resident diplomatic missions
 Australia has an embassy in Madrid.
 Spain has an embassy in Canberra and consulates-general in Melbourne and Sydney.

See also
 List of ambassadors of Australia to Spain
 Spanish Australians
 Gabriel de Castilla Base

References 

 
Spain
Bilateral relations of Spain